Pierre-Amédée Plasait (2 November 1878 – 29 September 1939) was a French sculptor. His work was part of the sculpture event in the art competition at the 1924 Summer Olympics.

References

External links
 

1878 births
1939 deaths
19th-century French sculptors
20th-century French sculptors
French male sculptors
Olympic competitors in art competitions
Sculptors from Paris
19th-century French male artists